Rausch Creek may refer to:

Rausch Creek, Pennsylvania, a populated place in Schuylkill County, Pennsylvania
Rausch Creek (Pine Creek), in Schuylkill County, Pennsylvania
Stony Creek (Susquehanna River), also referred to as Rausch Creek, in Dauphin County, Pennsylvania
Rausch Creek (Stony Creek), a tributary of the above